The 2014 European Parliament election in Luxembourg was held as part of the wider 2014 European Parliament elections. The Christian Social People's Party won three of Luxembourg's six seats.

Results

Elected members
 Viviane Reding (CSV) (126.888 votes)
 Charles Goerens (DP) (82.975 votes)
 Claude Turmes (Déi Gréng) (69.797 votes)
 Georges Bach (CSV) (68.242 votes)
 Frank Engel (CSV) (65.884 votes)
 Mady Delvaux-Stehres (LSAP) (33.323 votes)

Luxembourg
2014 in Luxembourg
European Parliament elections in Luxembourg